Magic Landing was a theme park located in El Paso, Texas, operating from 1984 to 1988. Magic Landing was one of two amusement parks operating in El Paso during the 1980s, the other being Western Playland.

Magic Landing opened to the public on July 4, 1984.  It included the Old Galveston Railway, a  narrow-gauge railroad within the park, among other attractions.

During Magic Landing's brief run, rumors of various incidents were circulated, but one confirmed incident caused the park's attendance numbers to fall over the next three years, and may have led to its closure. In the summer of 1985, Frank Guzman Jr, an 18-year-old male employee, was killed at the park. He was asked by a patron to retrieve his baseball hat for him from off the roller coaster track. The teenager climbed up the track and rested his arm on the active part of the track. Within a few minutes, the roller coaster went down the track and cut his arm off. After an hour on the track, the young man was rushed to William Beaumont Army Medical Center and died three hours later.

In 1988, Magic Landing closed to the public mid-season due to low attendance and problems obtaining the $1 million insurance policy required by the state. (The high insurance rate stemmed from the above-mentioned roller coaster death.) Since its closing, Magic Landing's buildings stood out in the El Paso desert, many of them falling apart, for over 20 years. (The rides, though, only remained until the early to mid-1990s.) In 2009, by the county's request, the remaining buildings and rubble on the property were demolished due to multiple incidents of vandalism and arson over the previous few years. CFI Trucking now uses the land as a lot for their trailers. The frame for the sign and base for ticket booths are among the only remnants of the park. Western Playland, El Paso's only other amusement park, has since been relocated to Sunland Park, New Mexico.

References

External links
 Satellite Image from WikiMapia, Google Maps, or Windows Live Local
 Magic Landing in Ruins

Defunct amusement parks in Texas
1984 establishments in Texas
1988 disestablishments in Texas